German submarine U-96 was a Type VIIC U-boat of the German Navy (Kriegsmarine) during World War II. It was made famous after the war in Lothar-Günther Buchheim's 1973 bestselling novel Das Boot and the 1981 Oscar-nominated film adaptation of the same name, both based on his experience on the submarine as a war correspondent in 1941.

The keel was laid down on 16 September 1939, by Germaniawerft, of Kiel as yard number 601. She was commissioned on 14 September 1940, with Kapitänleutnant Heinrich Lehmann-Willenbrock in command. Lehmann-Willenbrock was relieved in March 1942 by Oberleutnant zur See Hans-Jürgen Hellriegel, who was relieved in turn in March 1943 by Oblt.z.S. Wilhelm Peters. In February 1944, Oblt.z.S. Horst Willner took command, turning the boat over to Oblt.z.S. Robert Rix in June of that year. Rix commanded the boat until 15 February 1945.

Design
German Type VIIC submarines were preceded by the shorter Type VIIB submarines. U-96 had a displacement of  when at the surface and  while submerged. She had two shafts and two  propellers.

U-96 was fitted with five  torpedo tubes (four fitted at the bow and one at the stern), fourteen torpedoes, one  SK C/35 naval gun, 220 rounds, and a  C/30 anti-aircraft gun. The boat had a complement of between forty-four and sixty.

Service history
As part of the 7th U-boat Flotilla, stationed in Saint Nazaire, on the French Atlantic coast, U-96 conducted 11 patrols, sinking 27 ships totalling  and damaging four others totalling . The boat was a member of eleven wolfpacks. On 30 March 1945, U-96 was sunk by US bombs while in the submarine pens in Wilhelmshaven. In her entire career, she suffered no casualties to her crew. The boat was also known for her emblem, a green laughing sawfish. It became the symbol of the 9th Flotilla after Lehmann-Willenbrock took command in March 1942.

First patrol
U-96 departed Kiel on 4 December 1940 on her first patrol. Her route took her across the North Sea, through the gap between the Faroe and Shetland Islands and into the North Atlantic.

Most of her passengers and crew survived, her master, the convoy commodore and 21 others, however, perished. The crippled ship did not immediately sink, so at 21:30 U-96 launched a second torpedo. After the second hit, the ship still stayed afloat, so the U-boat began shelling her half an hour later. The ship finally went under at 22:42 in position . The 37 crew members of Towa abandoned ship in three lifeboats, one of which capsized, drowning its occupants. 19 survivors were later picked up by an escort.

Two and a half hours later the un-escorted Belgian Macedonier was sighted and  attacked with a single torpedo, which hit amidships, sinking her within 10 minutes in position . The crew had immediately abandoned ship and all but four out of 47 survived.

Later that day, at 21:02, U-96 fired at the British steamer Empire Razorbill, trying to stop her. After six rounds from her deck gun which resulted in three hits, U-96 abandoned the attack on the armed merchantman due to bad weather.

On 18 December, U-96 encountered the Dutch motor tanker Pendrecht and attacked her with a single torpedo at 16:15. The ship was hit astern but remained afloat. The crew, which had initially abandoned the ship, was able to re-board and sail her to Rothesay escorted by a British destroyer. U-96, which had lost contact during the night, remained in the general area, encountering a British battleship and her escorts, but could not attack.

Second patrol
On 9 January 1941, U-96 departed Lorient for her second war patrol. She returned to the waters west of Scotland, where she attacked the British   of  early in the morning of 16 January. Three torpedoes were launched by U-96 in the space of two hours, finally sinking the ship in position  at 06:16. One hundred and six passengers and crew perished, while 143 survivors were picked up by British destroyers.

A first torpedo was launched at 07:45, hitting the ship amidships, causing her to stop. A second torpedo hit the ship astern 20 minutes later, but still did not sink. Two more torpedoes were needed before Almeda Star sank in position , three minutes after the fourth and last torpedo was launched at 13:55. All passengers and crew, in total 360, were lost.

Third patrol
On 30 January 1941, U-96 left Lorient for her third war patrol in the North Atlantic. Two weeks into the patrol, she sighted a straggler from convoy HX 106 s, the British motor tanker Clea. The U-boat attacked shortly after 15:00 with a single torpedo, which hit Clea amidships, snapping her in half and setting the wreck on fire. The two halves were then sunk with artillery.
U-96 launched two more torpedoes into the burning wreck, sinking her in position .
 All 59 crew members perished in the attack. In the morning, escorts of HX 106 spotted and attacked U-96 with four depth charges, but the U-boat escaped without damage.

A second torpedo sank the ship twelve minutes later. Black Ospreys crew of 36 abandoned ship in heavy weather, however, only eleven survivors were picked up two days later.

On 21 February a Focke Wulf "Condor" of I./KG 40 attacked and damaged a straggler from convoy OB 287, the 6,999 GRT Scottish Standard, killing five of her crew. The crew abandoned ship and 39 survivors were picked up an escort, . On the next day, 22 February, U-96 came upon the abandoned tanker. Although there was a destroyer patrolling the area, U-96 was able to launch two torpedoes, sinking Scottish Standard in position . Following the second explosion, HMS Montgomery pursued the U-boat for five hours, dropping 37 depth charges without causing serious damage.

The U-boats sank nine ships, including one escort, three of which were claimed by U-96.

The first, the British 5,457 GRT cargo ship Anglo-Peruvian, was mistaken for an auxiliary cruiser and attacked with two torpedoes at 23:27. The ship sank within three minutes after being hit with the loss of 29 of her crew in position . The 17 survivors were later picked up by a British merchant ship. The ship sank 25 minutes after being hit by the torpedo at the stern. All 35 crew members were lost in the attack.
Six hours later, U-96 launched a second torpedo at the wreck, that had been abandoned by the crew, which included the commodore of OB 288, Rear Admiral R.A.A. Plowden, DSO. There were no survivors.

Upon arrival the commander of U-96, Heinrich Lehmann-Willenbrock, was presented with the Knight's Cross of the Iron Cross, which he had been awarded two days before. The Wehrmachtbericht had announced on 25 February that Lehmann had sunk 55,600 tons on his last patrol, and a total of 125,580 tons of Allied shipping since taking command of U-96.

Fourth patrol
On 12 April 1941 U-96 set to sea again for her fourth war patrol. On 16 April, the U-boat made contact with convoy OB 309 and was immediately attacked by an escort, HMS Rockingham, resulting in some damage to the boat. On 28 April, U-96 encountered her sister U-95 in contact with convoy HX 121. At 19:25 U-96 launched three torpedoes against three tankers in the convoy.
The second ship, the Norwegian tanker Caledonia, was hit in the engine room, killing seven crew members there. A further five crew members were killed when they drifted into the burning wreck of Oilfield nearby after jumping overboard. The rest of the crew survived when the rescue ship Zaafaran picked up 25 survivors in a lifeboat. Before the torpedo hit, U-96 was forced to submerge, as an escort, the Flower-class corvette  arrived on the scene. Port Hardy lost one crew member in the attack, while 97 passengers and crew were picked up by Zaafaran.

Shortly after 13:00 the next day, a slightly damaged U-96 was attacked by an aircraft, a Lockheed Hudson from No. 233 Squadron RAF, but the bombs did not cause any further damage. In the evening of 1 May, U-96 unsuccessfully attacked an unescorted freighter, before making contact with another convoy on 4 May. Contact was lost the next day, however. On 7 May, U-96 was spotted by a Short Sunderland shortly after noon, and over the course of two and a half hours, 32 bombs were dropped. Another air attack occurred a week later, on 14 May, when a four-engine aircraft dropped three bombs on the U-boat.

Mistaking her for a 9000 GRT tanker, U-96 launched two torpedoes. Empire Ridge broke in half when the torpedoes hit, taking with her 31 of a crew of 33.

Fifth patrol
The fifth war patrol started on 19 June 1941, when U-96 left Saint Nazaire for the North Atlantic again. Two weeks into the patrol, U-96 made contact with a small convoy. U-96 was under the impression that she had hit the survey ship and the AMC; instead, she had struck Anselm twice, sinking her and killing 254 people. Starworts ASDIC was not working, but Lavender and Petunia counter-attacked with depth charges. The U-boat was seriously damaged and forced to curtail her patrol.

Sixth patrol
On 2 August 1941, U-96 left for her sixth patrol in the North Atlantic. On 12 August, the U-boat was part of group Greenland. Two weeks later, on 28 August, she joined group Prince-Elector. In early September, U-96 belonged to group Seawolf before returning to base. On 12 September she entered St.Nazaire after 42 days at sea, without attacking any ships.

Seventh patrol
On 27 October, U-96 left for her seventh patrol with journalist Lothar-Günther Buchheim aboard and joined group Stoßtrupp three days later. The next day, 31 October, the group made contact with convoy OS 10. U-96 launched four torpedoes at a long range, one of which struck the Dutch . The ship went down half an hour after being hit, taking nine of her crew of 56 with her.
Following the attack, the sloop  arrived on the scene and forced U-96 under water with gun fire. The U-boat escaped the barrage of 27 depth charges unscathed.

The U-boat spent November patrolling the North Atlantic as part of groups Störtebecker and Benecke, until secretly entering the neutral port 
of Vigo, Spain, and being resupplied by the interned German  on 27 November. After leaving Vigo, U-96 made for the Straits of Gibraltar, with orders to enter the Mediterranean. However, late on 30 November the U-boat was spotted by a Fairey Swordfish of 812 Naval Air Squadron and heavily damaged by two bombs dropped by the aircraft. Unable to reach her destination, U-96 made for the port of Saint Nazaire. On the way she encountered the Spanish , which returned from South America, after delivering a group of Jewish refugees to the Dutch colony of Curaçao, when Brazil denied them entry. When U-96s torpedo missed, the ship was stopped and her papers checked. 

Eighth patrol
The boat's eighth patrol saw success when she operated off the Canadian east coast. She sank Lake Osweya near Halifax on 20 February 1942. She was only  from her target when the torpedo was launched.

She sank Torungen off Nova Scotia on 22 February and attacked Kars later the same day. The latter ship broke in two following the torpedo's impact. The bow section quickly sank, but the stern section was beached and declared a total loss.

Ninth and tenth patrols
For the ninth patrol, U-96 left St. Nazaire on 23 April 1942 and returned 73 days later, on 1 July without attacking anything.

On the tenth patrol, the boat damaged F. J. Wolfe on 10 September 1942 (although this ship was able to keep up with her convoy). U-96 also sank Sveve on the same day, as well as Elisabeth van Belgie. It also sank Deläes on the 11th.

Eleventh patrol
The boat's final operational patrol commenced with her departure from Saint Nazaire on 26 December 1942.

After active service
She spent most of the rest of the war as a training vessel. She was decommissioned on 15 February 1945 in  Wilhelmshaven.

When US Eighth Air Force attacked Wilhelmshaven on 30 March 1945, U-96 was sunk in Hipper basin. The remains of the U-boat were broken up after the war.

As of 2022, there is only one surviving crew member of the U-96, Friedrich  Grade (1916- ).

In popular culture

Books
During 1941, war correspondent Lothar-Günther Buchheim joined U-96 for her seventh patrol. His orders were to photograph and describe the U-boat in action for propaganda purposes. Over 5,000 photographs, most of them taken by Buchheim, survived the war. From his experiences, he wrote a short story, "Die Eichenlaubfahrt" (The Oak-Leaves Patrol) and a 1973 novel which was to become an international best-seller, Das Boot (The Boat), followed in 1976 by U-Boot-Krieg (U-Boat War), a nonfiction chronicle of the voyage.

Film

In 1981 Wolfgang Petersen created the critically acclaimed film Das Boot based on Buchheim's novel of the same name with several alterations to the plot and characters.  Both the novel and the film had a much darker ending than in reality, where the U-boat returns to port only to be destroyed during an air raid with many of her crew killed or wounded.  In reality, U-96 survived war service, being decommissioned in February 1945 and converted into a training vessel. U-96 was sunk one month later in March by Allied bombs.  The same replica of U-96 was used in Steven Spielberg's 1981 film Raiders of the Lost Ark, but has the number U-26, which in reality was a Type IA U-boat.

Video games 

In 2019, Deep Water Studio released the video game UBOAT in early access. UBOAT gives the player command of U-96 during the Second World War.

U-96 is also featured as one of the five playable submarines in the video game Wolfpack released by Usurpator AP into early access in 2019.

The U-boat is also featured in the mobile game Azur Lane in an anthropomorphised form.

Wolfpacks
U-96 took part in eleven wolfpacks:
 Hammer (5–12 August 1941) 
 Grönland (12–27 August 1941) 
 Kurfürst (28 August – 2 September 1941) 
 Seewolf (2–10 September 1941) 
 Stosstrupp (30 October – 4 November 1941), with Buchheim present on board 
 Störtebecker (5–19 November 1941) 
 Benecke (19–22 November 1941) 
 Hecht (11 May – 18 June 1942) 
 Stier (29 August – 2 September 1942) 
 Vorwärts (3–25 September 1942) 
 Jaguar (10–20 January 1943)

Summary of raiding history
U-96 conducted eleven patrols, sinking 27 ships totalling  and damaging four others totalling .

References

Bibliography

External links

Collection of Lothar-Gunther Buchheim's photos from his U-96 patrol

German Type VIIC submarines
U-boats commissioned in 1940
U-boats sunk in 1945
U-boats sunk by US aircraft
World War II submarines of Germany
World War II shipwrecks in the North Sea
1940 ships
Ships built in Kiel
Maritime incidents in March 1945